The Asia Pacific Screen Award for Best Animated Feature Film is given each year for animated films made in the Asia-Pacific region.

Winners and nominees

References

External links

Animated Feature Film
Awards for best animated feature film
Lists of films by award
Awards established in 2007